Dodital is a freshwater lake in uttarkashi district, Uttarakhand, India, situated at a height of . The Assi Ganga river emerges from Dodital and joins Bhagirathi at the confluence in Gangori, near Uttarkashi.

References 

Lakes of Uttarakhand
Uttarkashi district
Hiking trails in Uttarakhand